The 2021 Asian Taekwondo Championships were the 24th edition of the Asian Taekwondo Championships, and were held from 16 to 18 June 2021 in Nouhad Naufal Stadium, Zouk Mikael, near Beirut, Lebanon.

Medal summary

Men

Women

Medal table

Team ranking

Men

Women

References

External links
WT Asia

Asian Championships
Asian Taekwondo Championships
Asian Taekwondo Championships
Asian Taekwondo Championships, 2021
Asian Taekwondo Championships